Mirko Larghetti (born 19 September 1982) is an Italian professional boxer. He held the European Union cruiserweight title from 2013 to 2014, and has challenged once for the WBO cruiserweight title in 2014.

Professional career
Larghetti made his professional debut on 15 March 2009, scoring a fifth-round disqualification win over Boris Uhlik. In his fifteenth fight, on 18 November 2011, Larghetti won his first regional championship—the vacant WBC Silver International cruiserweight title—by stopping Laszlo Hubert in six rounds. This was improved upon two years later, on 15 June 2013, when Larghetti stopped Vincenzo Rossitto in eight rounds to become the European Union cruiserweight champion. Larghetti made one successful defence of the title on 22 November 2013, winning a unanimous decision over Stjepan Vugdelija.

In 2014, having fought exclusively in Italy, Larghetti received an opportunity to fight for his first world title, against long-reigning WBO cruiserweight champion Marco Huck in Germany. The fight was originally scheduled for 29 March, but was moved to 30 August after Huck sustained a thumb injury during training. Huck went on to win a wide unanimous decision, handing Larghetti his first professional loss, but the conclusion of the fight was criticised when Huck appeared to score a last-second knockout in the final round; this was overturned by the referee, who ruled that Larghetti's knockdown had occurred after the bell had sounded.

Professional boxing record

References

External links

Italian male boxers
Cruiserweight boxers
1982 births
Sportspeople from the Province of Pesaro and Urbino
Living people
21st-century Italian people